Cupid's Round Up is a lost 1918 American silent Western film directed by Edward LeSaint and starring Tom Mix. It was produced and distributed by Fox Film Corporation. This was Mix's first film with Fox.

Cast
 Tom Mix as Larry Kelly
 Wanda Hawley as Helen Baldwin (credited as Wanda Petit)
 Edwin B. Tilton as James Kelly (credited Edwin Booth Tilton)
 Roy Watson as Buckland
 Verna Mersereau as Peggy Blair
 Alfred Paget as Jim Cocksey (credited as Al Paget)
 Frederick R. Clark as McGinnis (credited as Fred Clark)
 Eugenie Forde as Red Bird

See also
 1937 Fox vault fire
 Tom Mix filmography

References

External links

 
 
 lobby poster

1918 films
1918 Western (genre) films
1918 lost films
American black-and-white films
Films directed by Edward LeSaint
Fox Film films
Lost American films
Lost Western (genre) films
Silent American Western (genre) films
1910s American films
1910s English-language films